"Living in Danger" is a song recorded by Swedish group Ace of Base. It was released in October 1994 as the seventh and final single from their debut album, Happy Nation (U.S. version) and fourth single from their American debut release, The Sign (1993). The single peaked at number 20 on the US Billboard Hot 100 and also topped the Billboard Hot Dance Club Play chart in December 1994. On the US Cash Box Top 100, it peaked at number ten. The single later reached number 18 on the UK Singles Chart in January 1995. Ace of Base performed it on the first ever MTV Europe Music Awards in Berlin, Germany in 1994. Q Magazine included "Living in Danger" in their list of the "1001 Best Songs Ever" in 2003.

Jonas Berggren has said the song "is about living on your own" and advising listeners, "Don't trust [people] too much... you'll do better on your own." In contrast, Jenny Berggren has described it as being about social pressure to engage in dangerous behaviors like smoking and drinking.

Chart performance
"Living in Danger" was a sizeable hit on the charts on several continents, although it didn't reach the same level of success as "The Sign" and "Don't Turn Around". In Europe, it made its way into the top 20 in Austria, Ireland, Scotland and the United Kingdom. In the latter, the single peaked at number 18 in its first week at the UK Singles Chart, on January 8, 1995. But on the UK Dance Chart, it was a bigger hit, reaching number 11. Additionally, "Living in Danger" was a top 30 hit in Belgium, Germany, the Netherlands, Sweden and Switzerland, and a top 40 hit in France and Iceland, as well as on the Eurochart Hot 100. On MTV's European Top 20, the song reached number six. Outside Europe, it climbed into the top 10 in Canada, peaking at number seven on the RPM Top Singles chart and within the top 20 on the US Billboard Hot 100. And it also hit number-one on the Billboard Hot Dance Club Play chart and number ten on the Cash Box Top 100.

Critical reception
In an retrospective review, Annie Zaleski from The A.V. Club noted that the song take influence from "easygoing reggae". Upon the single release, Larry Flick from Billboard stated that the Swedish pop phenomenon "shows no sign of loosening its hypnotic hold over top 40 programmers and pop-minded consumers." He added that the song "sticks pretty close to the formula of previous hits: Galloping pop/reggae beats are covered with fluttering synths, a contagious hook, and somewhat disconnected vocal." British columnist James Masterton felt that "Living in Danger" "is typical Ace Of Base, pop-driven dub-reggae yet with a somehow dark, almost gothic feel." John Kilgo from The Network Forty constated that "already stamped as "The Artists of '94", the Swedish quartet strikes again. Showcasing their trademark groove, this number will soar to the top of the charts." Pop Rescue viewed it as "catchy" in their review of Happy Nation, adding that "vocally, it's probably the best track so far".

Live performances
Ace of Base performed "Living in Danger" on the first MTV Europe Music Awards held in Germany in 1994. They performed in the front of Berlin's Brandenburg Gate. The band was also nominated for Best Cover with their previous hit-single "Don't Turn Around" this year.

Music video
The accompanying music video for "Living in Danger" was directed by Swedish-based director Matt Broadley and shot in Kungsträdgårdens tunnelbana, an underground metro station in Stockholm, Sweden in September 1994. It was A-listed on France's MCM in December 1994 and later published on Ace of Base's official YouTube channel in January 2015. The video had generated more than 24 million views as of December 2022. Broadley had previously directed the videos for "All That She Wants", "Happy Nation" and "Don't Turn Around". 

The video of "Living in Danger" opens with the four members of Ace of Base, each of them following one of four people into the underground metro. These are a priest, a war veteran, a female worker of the station and a woman with paranoia. The worker sits in the ticket booth watching the busy people passing by, as if no one really noticed her. On the metro carriage, the paranoic woman looks at the war veteran (who is seen, in flashbacks, during the war being blessed by the priest, who is actually on the same carriage) by the mirror. Then she runs off the train as soon as it reaches the station, scared. In her haste, she falls over behind the ticket office. The station worker helps her up and offers her some coffee. When both men leave the train, the veteran recognizes the priest and the two begin talking, cheerfully. At the end of the video we see Joker and Buddha leaving the metro station together. Linn and Jenny are standing together on the metro.

One of the people used a Game Boy in the video.

Track listings

 12" single, UK
"Living In Danger" (Old School Mix) — 4:55
"Living In Danger" (For The Big Clubs Mix) — 10:15
"Living In Danger" (D-House Mix Long Version) — 10:03
"Living In Danger" (New Buddha Version) — 3:35

 CD single, UK & Europe
"Living In Danger" (Single Edit) — 3:10
"Living In Danger" (Old School Mix) (Short Version) — 3:39
"Living In Danger" (D-House Mix) (Long Version) — 10:03
"Living In Danger" (New Buddha Version) — 3:36
"Living In Danger" (For The Big Clubs Mix) — 10:15

 CD maxi, UK
"Living in Danger" (Radio Edit) — 3:10
"Living in Danger" (Old School Mix Short Version) — 3:39
"Living in Danger" (D-House Mix Long Version) — 10:03
"Living in Danger" (New Buddha Version) — 3:35
"Living in Danger" (For The Big Clubs Mix) — 10:15

 CD maxi, US
"Living in Danger" (Radio Remix) — 3:10
"Living in Danger" (Album Version) — 3:19
"Living in Danger" (Old School Mix) — 4:56
"Living in Danger" (D-House Mix) — 10:08
"Living in Danger" (Principle Mix) — 8:50
"Living in Danger" (Buddha Version) — 3:35

Personnel
 Vocals by Linn Berggren. Rap by Ulf Ekberg
 Backing Vocals by Jenny Berggren,John Ballard.
 Written by Jonas Berggren Ulf Ekberg
 Produced by Tommy Ekman and Per Adebratt
 Pre-Production by Jonas Berggren and Ulf Ekberg, T.O.E.C.
 Recorded at Tuff Studios, Gothenburg

Release history

Charts

Weekly charts

Year-end charts

References

External links

1993 songs
1994 singles
Ace of Base songs
Arista Records singles
English-language Swedish songs
Mega Records singles
Music videos directed by Matt Broadley
Songs written by Jonas Berggren
Songs written by Ulf Ekberg